The DPR Korea Premier Football League is a North Korean association football league that serves as the top-tier of the North Korean football league system. As of the 2017–18 season, featuring thirteen teams that play a full season of home-and-away matches. The 2018-2019 season started on 1 December 2018 and was scheduled to end October 2019. April 25 leads all clubs in titles, with 19.

Overview
Initially, all sports in North Korea were on an amateur basis, with competitions called Technical Innovation Contests (Chosŏn'gŭl: 기술혁신경기대회; Hanja: 技術革新競技大會) being held several times a year since 1960s.

In 1977, sport in the country was reformed, creating professional teams with paid players for each sport. Since then, an annual championship, called the National Championship, has been held September through each year, together with several other competitions each year. These include the Man'gyŏndae Prize held since at least 2002 in March through April in honour of Kim Il-sung's birthday, the Paektusan Prize held since at least 2010 in February in honour of Kim Jong-il's birthday, and the Poch'ŏnbo Torch Prize held since 2010 in May through June to mark the anniversary of the Battle of Poch'ŏnbo. The Osandŏk Prize competition, held in December in honour of Kim Jong-suk, was originally the primary tournament of North Korean ice hockey and other winter sports, but football was added in 2015.

From 1972 a national cup competition called the DPR Korea Championships was held each year. The last one was held in 2012, to be replaced by the Hwaebul Cup first held in 2013.

In 2010, football's National Championship was renamed Top Class Football League or Highest Class Football League (Chosŏn'gŭl: 최상급축구련맹전; Hanja: 最上級蹴球聯盟戰), but was still held together with the National Championships of other sports, and the other football competitions of the year.

This competition was last held in October 2017, after which it was replaced by the DPR Korea Premier Football League (Chosŏn'gŭl: 조선민주주의인민공화국 1부류축구련맹전; Hanja:  朝鮮民主主義人民共和國 一部流蹴球聯盟戰) held in the home-and-away round-robin style used in most other countries.

Each sports club - including their football sections - is classified as 1st class, 2nd class, and 3rd class. 1st class clubs are the fully professional teams that play in the highest levels of the given sport; in football's case, the DPRK Premier League and the second level. 2nd class clubs are smaller and rated to be of lower grade, though their top football teams take part in the upper levels and occasionally do achieve promotion into the highest division; provincial representative clubs are also included in the 2nd class. 3rd class clubs do not take part in the highest levels of competition, as they are strictly amateur, being the free-time sports clubs belonging to various factories and other state enterprises. There are several national-level amateur tournaments as well, such as the Inter-Provincial Games and the Songun Torch Prize for provincial representative teams, as well as annual football tournaments for the amateur factory and civil servant teams.

Participation in Asian club competitions
Due to the unusual nature of the domestic football competitions, North Korean teams only rarely took part in international club competitions of the Asian Football Confederation. The first time a North Korean club took part in an AFC club competition was the 1985–86 Asian Club Championship, when April 25 SC took part as the previous season's North Korean champions, though they did not advance from the qualifying round. North Korean teams also took part in the 1986, 1987, 1988–89, 1989–90, 1990–91 and 1991 editions of the Asian Club Championships, with some success; in 1988–89, April 25 finished first in their group in the qualifying round, but did not advance from their group in the semi-final round. The best result of a North Korean club was in the 1990–91 Asian Club Championship, when April 25 reached the semi-finals, losing to Liaoning FC of China; however, April 25 then went on to defeat Pelita Jaya of Indonesia in the third-place match. April 25 represented North Korea in six of the seven seasons in which North Korean teams took part in the Asian Club Championship. The only time a different club took part was in the 1989–90 edition, in which North Korea was represented by Ch'andongja SC; Ch'andongja finished last in their qualifying round group, and did not advance.

After the 1991 Asian Club Championship, in which April 25 advanced as far as the group stage, North Korean teams did not compete in any Asian club competitions for over twenty years, when Rimyŏngsu SC were invited to take part in the 2014 edition of the AFC President's Cup. Rimyŏngsu performed well, finishing second in their group in the first round. They went undefeated in the second round to top their group and advance to the final, in which they lost 1–2 to HTTU Ashgabat of Turkmenistan - who had finished first in Rimyŏngsu's group in the first round. However, the 2014 edition proved to be the last time the President's Cup was held.

The 2016 North Korean champions and runners up, April 25 and Kigwancha respectively, were invited to take part in the 2017 AFC Cup. Both started in the group stage, in the same group; April 25 advanced to the knockout stage, with a +1 goal differential over Kigwancha. April 25 faced Bengaluru FC of India, losing 0:3 on aggregate. The 2017 DPRK League champions and runners up are presently taking part in the 2018 AFC Cup; as the champions, April 25 will begin play in Group I of the group stage. The runners-up, Hwaebul SC, had to first play in the play-off round of the qualifying play-offs. There, they faced Erchim FC of Mongolia, winning 7–0 on aggregate to advance to the group stage, where they will play matches against April 25, Hang Yuen F.C. of Taiwan, and Benfica de Macau. Both teams will travel abroad for away matches, and foreign teams will travel to North Korea; April 25 will use the Rungrado 1st of May Stadium as its home field, whilst Hwaebul will use Kim Il-sung Stadium as its home venue. As a result of the new league structure, the champions and runners up of the 2017–18 Premier League season will take part in the 2019 AFC Cup.

Clubs (2019–20 Season)

Champions

Technical Innovation Contests & National Championship
 System was unknown

Highest Class Football League 
 Round-robin tournament system was introduced

DPR Korea Premier Football League

Performance by club

References

External links
DPR Korea Football Facebook
DPRK Premier Football League 
North Korea - List of Champions at RSSSF
Football for the Peoples. North Korea
North Korean Football Club's Real English Name

 
1
Korea
Sports leagues established in 1960
Sports leagues established in 2017
1960 establishments in North Korea
2017 establishments in North Korea